Joseph Stanley Brown served as private secretary to the twentieth President of the United States, James A. Garfield. He would completely devote himself to Garfield, as seen when Garfield asked "What can I do for you?" at their first meeting, prompting Brown to respond, " "It's not what you can do for me, but what I can do for you, sir." Brown would serve as Garfield's secretary during his brief presidency, controlling the office-seekers that ran rampant due to the spoils system, which Garfield's vice president Chester Arthur would eventually reform.  He married President Garfield's daughter Mary "Mollie" Garfield in 1888.

Brown was born in Washington, D.C. and attended Washington, D.C. public schools where he learned shorthand and typing. He went to the Sheffield Scientific School at Yale University and studied geology. Brown served as a stenographer for John Wesley Powell. the founder of the United States Geological Survey. Brown was also involved in the banking and railroad businesses. He died in Pasadena, California.

See also
 James A. Garfield

References

1858 births
1941 deaths
Academics from Washington, D.C.
American geologists
Yale School of Engineering & Applied Science alumni
Presidency of James A. Garfield
Personal secretaries to the President of the United States
United States Geological Survey personnel